Hutchinson Creek is a stream in the U.S. state of Washington.

Hutchinson Creek was named after one Mrs. Hutchinson, a pioneer settler.

See also
List of rivers of Washington

References

Rivers of Whatcom County, Washington
Rivers of Washington (state)